Paranectria is a genus of fungi in the class Sordariomycetes. It consists of three species.

References

Hypocreales genera
Bionectriaceae
Taxa described in 1878
Taxa named by Pier Andrea Saccardo